Little River Band (LRB) is an Australian (now American) soft rock band from Melbourne, Victoria. Formed in March 1975, the group originally featured lead vocalist Glenn Shorrock, guitarists and vocalists Beeb Birtles and Graeham Goble, lead guitarist Ric Formosa, bassist Roger McLachlan, and drummer Derek Pellicci. Since its formation, the band has been through numerous lineup changes and currently includes bassist and lead vocalist Wayne Nelson (from 1980 to 1996, and since 1999), keyboardist and vocalist Chris Marion (since 2004), drummer and vocalist Ryan Ricks (since 2012), guitarist and vocalist Colin Whinnery (since 2018), and guitarist and vocalist Bruce Wallace (since 2022),

History

1975–82
LRB was formed in March 1975 by lead vocalist Glenn Shorrock, guitarist-vocalists Beeb Birtles and Graeham Goble, lead guitarist Ric Formosa, bassist Roger McLachlan, and drummer Derek Pellicci. The previous month, before taking on its new name, the group had recorded a cover version of the Everly Brothers song "When Will I Be Loved" with lead guitarist Graham Davidge and bassist Dave Orams, however this remained unreleased until 1988 when it was featured on the compilation Too Late to Load. With the original lineup, LRB recorded its self-titled 1975 debut album and follow-up After Hours, before Formosa left in August 1976; he was replaced by David Briggs, while the group also brought in George McArdle to take over from McLachlan, with whom they "weren't 100 per cent happy".

With Briggs and McArdle, LRB achieved international success with the releases of Diamantina Cocktail in 1977 and Sleeper Catcher in 1978. For a world tour in the summer of 1978, Pellicci was temporarily replaced by Geoff Cox, a former bandmate of Briggs in the band Cycle, after suffering burn injuries which rendered him unable to perform. At the same time, Mal Logan was brought in as a touring keyboardist. Following Pellicci's return, the group recorded three shows in November 1978 for its first live album, Backstage Pass. At the end of January 1979, however, McArdle also left after converting to Christianity and deciding to attend Bible college full-time. He was not immediately replaced, with bass on First Under the Wire performed by session musicians Clive Harrison and Mike Clarke.

In July 1979, McArdle's official replacement was announced to be Barry Sullivan. He remained for less than a year, however, before former Jim Messina Band bassist Wayne Nelson took over in April 1980. The new lineup recorded Time Exposure in 1981, although before it was released Briggs left the group. He was replaced in August 1981 by Stephen Housden, formerly of Stevie Wright's band. Following a world tour which spawned the live video Live Exposure, frontman Shorrock left LRB in February 1982 to focus on his solo career. In subsequent years, Shorrock has claimed that he did not leave the band voluntarily, and was instead sacked. Nelson has supported the claim, suggesting that guitarist Beeb Birtles "voted to oust" the singer which led to the band subsequently "dismantling".

1982–98
Glenn Shorrock was replaced in February 1982 by John Farnham. His first recording with LRB was "The Other Guy", which was released on the compilation Greatest Hits. Following the release of The Net, the band added its first official keyboardist in David Hirschfelder, who joined in time for tour dates in September 1983. Within six months of his arrival, the group had lost two more founding members – Beeb Birtles left in October 1983 and Derek Pellicci followed in February 1984, both due to stylistic differences. Birtles was not replaced, while former Cold Chisel drummer Steve Prestwich took over from Pellicci ready for the recording of Playing to Win in July 1984. A second album, No Reins, followed in 1986.

For a short Australian tour in April 1986, Prestwich was replaced by touring drummer Malcolm Wakeford. However, this would prove to be the final tour with several band members, and the band's last activity for almost two years, as Farnham left in October that year to focus on his solo career. The group subsequently disbanded, citing "frustration over diminishing record sales and radio airplay". After months of rumours, LRB officially reformed in December 1987 with original lead singer Glenn Shorrock. Stephen Housden, Graeham Goble and Wayne Nelson returned from the 1986 lineup, alongside original drummer Derek Pellicci. James Roche joined as the band's touring keyboardist. This lineup issued Monsoon in 1988 and Get Lucky in 1990.

Goble – now the sole constant member of LRB – performed his last shows with the band in April 1989. It was officially announced in March the next year that he would no longer tour with the group, in order to focus primarily on his side project Broken Voices. He was replaced by former Player frontman Peter Beckett, while Tony Sciuto joined as the group's new keyboardist. This lineup issued Worldwide Love in 1991, a compilation on which the title track was a new recording. By summer 1992, Goble had left permanently and Sciuto had been temporarily replaced by Richard Bryant. After a tour which spawned the live album Live Classics, Sciuto returned.

In 1996, both lead vocalists Shorrock and Nelson left LRB, replaced by Steve Wade and Hal Tupaea, respectively. After a touring cycle which ran until late 1997, Beckett left the band to return to Player, to which he also brought Sciuto. Pellicci also left for a second time, leaving the group with no founding members for the first time in its history. At this point, Stephen Housden acquired the rights to the LRB band name, after Shorrock reportedly declined an offer to rejoin the outfit.

Since 1998
Retaining Steve Wade as frontman, Stephen Housden rebuilt LRB in early 1998 with the addition of Icehouse guitarist Paul Gildea, original LRB bassist Roger McLachlan, drummer Kevin Murphy and former Air Supply keyboardist Adrian Scott. McLachlan and Scott remained only for a year, before they were replaced in early 1999 by returning Wayne Nelson and new member Glenn Reither. One year later, Gildea was replaced by Greg Hind. Wade also left the group at the same time, at which point Nelson took over as the band's lead vocalist. This lineup issued the group's first studio album in 11 years, Where We Started From.

Shortly after the release of Test of Time in 2004, Reither was replaced by Chris Marion. Murphy was also briefly replaced by Kip Raines, although he was unable to commit to the band full-time and was himself replaced early the next year by Billy Thomas. In March 2006, LRB's longest-running continuous member Stephen Housden stepped down from touring, with Rich Herring brought in to take his place. This lineup released studio album Re-arranged and live collection Standing Room Only, before Thomas was replaced by Mel Watts in early 2007. Watts remained until early 2012, recording two Christmas albums with the group, before he was replaced by Ryan Ricks. During 2017, Hind was briefly unable to tour due to a carpal tunnel injury, with Colin Whinnery temporarily taking his place; Whinnery returned on a permanent basis early the next year, after Hind chose to leave following a series of family issues. In 2022, Bruce Wallace replaced Rich Herring on guitar and vocals.

Members

Current

Former

Touring

Timelines

Members

Recording

Lineups

References

External links
Little River Band official website

Lists of members by band